A kitten is a juvenile cat. Young animals of other species are also sometimes called kittens, for instance young rabbits, rats, or badgers.

Kitten or Kittens may also refer to:
 Atomic Kitten, a pop musical group formed in 1998
 Mercury Kitten, a 1920s American aircraft
 Dart Kitten, a 1930s British ultra-light aircraft
 Grumman Kitten, a 1940s American aircraft
 Reliant Kitten, a car 
 Kittens (band), a noise rock musical group formed in 1992
 Kitten (band), an indie rock musical group formed in 2009
 Kitten heel, a part of a shoe
 KitTen, an Arduino compatible board

See also
Khitan (disambiguation)
Kitty (given name)
Kitty (disambiguation)